The Iron Arrow Honor Society is an honor society at the University of Miami in Coral Gables, Florida for students, faculty, staff and alumni. It is the highest honor that can be bestowed by the university. 

Founded at the University of Miami in 1926, the society admits about thirty members annually, including undergraduate, School of Law and Miller School of Medicine students, alumni, and University of Miami faculty, staff, and administrators. Membership requires unanimous votes of the membership. Criteria include scholarship, leadership, character, humility, and love of alma mater.

History
The society was founded in 1926 as the "Highest Honor Attained by Men." In 1937, Nu Kappa Tau, a separate sister organization at the university, was founded as "The Highest Honor Attained by Women." In 1966, Nu Kappa Tau became affiliated with the national honor society Mortar Board, "leaving Iron Arrow to carry the tradition alone."

In 1976, the federal government notified the University of Miami that it was providing significant assistance to Iron Arrow in violation of Title IX of the Education Amendments of 1972. The university responded by having Iron Arrow move its tapping ceremony off campus and negotiated with it to accept women members. Iron Arrow, in turn, sued the federal government seeking the right to continue on campus as a male-only organization. 

In 1982, university president Edward T. Foote II wrote Iron Arrow stating that regardless of the court case's outcome, Iron Arrow would not be allowed back on campus as a male-only organization. This rendered the court case moot before it was scheduled to be heard in 1983 by the U.S. Supreme Court in Iron Arrow Honor Soc. v. Heckler. 

In 1985, breaking with over fifty years of tradition, the society's all-male membership voted to admit women and Iron Arrow was allowed back on campus.

Iron Arrow Honor Society has been the subject of two books, Iron Arrow: A History (published in 1976) and Iron Arrow: A History, Seventy-Five Years (published in 2001).

Controversies
In July 2020, Iron Arrow faced criticism from some in the University of Miami community and some Native Americans for "cultural appropriation," though the Iron Arrow Honor Society is an officially sanctioned clan of the Miccosukee tribe of Florida.

Prominent members

Notes

External links
Official website 
"Arrow Heads", Miami Magazine, University of Miami alumni magazine, Fall 2000

1926 establishments in Florida
1983 in law
History of women's rights in the United States
Honor societies
Student organizations established in 1926
Student societies in the United States
University of Miami